So Many Days is an album by Julie Doiron, released on October 23, 2012, on Aporia Records. It is Doiron's ninth solo album, and her third to be produced by her former Eric's Trip bandmate Rick White.

Track listing
"Cars and Trucks"
"By the Lake"
"Can't Make It No More"
"Another Second Chance"
"Our Love"
"Where Are You?"
"The Only"
"I Thought I Could Do It"
"The Gambler"
"Beneath the Leaves"
"Homeless"
"Last Night I Lay in Bed"

References

Julie Doiron albums
2012 albums